Paschim Vihar West is a station on the Green Line of the Delhi Metro and is located in the West Delhi district of Delhi. It is an elevated station and was inaugurated on 2 April 2010. Paschim Vihar is one of the posh colonies of West Delhi. There are many schools located here like  Vishal Bharti Public School, where Indian cricketer Virat Kohli has studied for 3 years and reside in Paschim Vihar, Indraprastha World School, G D Goenka Public School, Doon Public School near Jwala Heri Market and Saraswati Bal Mandir. Closest to the metro station is jwala heri market which is a very huge marketplace. Punjabis mostly dominate in this area with a handful of Haryanvis and Bengalis living in two Bengali colonies near the Paschim Vihar East Metro Station- Shorodeeya Apartments and Nivedita Enclave. It is just 1 km away and is near to the Jwala Heri Market.
The Vishal Bharati Public school is important landmark near this metro station.

Station layout

Facilities

ATMs are available at Paschim Vihar West metro station.

See also
List of Delhi Metro stations
Transport in Delhi
Delhi Metro Rail Corporation
Delhi Suburban Railway
List of rapid transit systems in India

References

External links

 Delhi Metro Rail Corporation Ltd. (Official site) 
 Delhi Metro Annual Reports
 
 UrbanRail.Net – descriptions of all metro systems in the world, each with a schematic map showing all stations.

Delhi Metro stations
Railway stations opened in 2010
Railway stations in West Delhi district